Rictrude (Rictrudis, Richtrudis, Richrudis) (c. 614–688) was abbess of Marchiennes Abbey, in Flanders. The main early source for her life is the Vita Rictrudis, commissioned by the abbey, and written in 907 by Hucbald.

Life
She was from a noble family in Gascony, the daughter of Ernoldo, lord of Toulouse. She married Adalbard, Duke of Douai, despite the opposition of some members of her family. In Hucbald's account, this is shown deliberately as a model marriage. It is unclear whether she had four or five children. Her four known children were: Clotsinda, successor as abbess, Adalsinda, Eusebia and Maurantius.

The couple opened their castle to the poor and disadvantaged. The hermit-monk Richarius was a family friend. Around the year 630, Adalbald founded Marchiennes Abbey, on the advice of Amandus of Maastricht. In 643, Rictrude made it a double monastery.

Adalbard was murdered in obscure circumstances around 652, near Périgueux during a subsequent expedition to Aquitaine, probably by his wife's relatives still bitter about the marriage to an enemy of her people. After her husband's death, Rictrude resisted royal pressure to remarry and retired to Marchiennes Abbey, with her daughters and became abbess. In this she was supported by Amandus, Abbot of Elnon. Rectrude died in 688. 

Rictrude is recognized as a Catholic saint; her feast day is 12 May. Her four children are also saints.

Clotsinda
Born around 638, Clotsinda was a younger daughter of Rictrude and Adalbard duke of Douai, In 688, she succeeded her mother as the second abbess of the double monastery of Marchiennes Abbey. She died around 714.
Her siblings Maurontius, Adalsinda and Eusebia are also honored as saints.

Her feast day is of May 5; Closinda is especially venerated in Douai. In the Orthodox faith, she is commemorated on June 30.

References

Sources
Jo Ann McNamara, John E. Halborg, E. Gordon Whatley (1992), Sainted Women of the Dark Ages, pp. 195–219

688 deaths
7th-century Frankish saints
7th-century Frankish women
Year of birth unknown
Christian female saints of the Middle Ages
Colombanian saints